Tibetan bell may refer to:

 Tingsha, traditional Tibetan cymbal bells
 shang (bell), a Tibetan hand-bell
 Singing bowl
 Tibetan Bells (album), a 1971 album by Henry Wolff and Nancy Hennings